

The PDSA Gold Medal is an animal bravery award that acknowledges the bravery and devotion to duty of animals. It was created by the People's Dispensary for Sick Animals (PDSA) in 2001, and is now recognised as the animal equivalent of the George Cross. The Gold Medal is considered as the civilian equivalent to PDSA's Dickin Medal for military animals. An animal can be awarded the PDSA Gold Medal if it assists in saving human or non-human life when its own life is in danger or through exceptional devotion to duty. The medal can also be awarded to animals in public service, such as police or rescue dogs, if the animal dies or suffers serious injury while carrying out its official duties in the face of armed and violent opposition.

The first ceremony, in November 2002, saw the Gold medal awarded to three dogs, including Endal, an assistance dog whose actions helped to save the life of his disabled owner.  , the PDSA Gold Medal has been awarded to 29 different animals. All recipients were dogs until 2020, when a mine-sniffing African giant pouched rat named Magawa received the prize. The majority of recipients have been British. Non-British recipients include Bamse, who was Norwegian, George and Gage, both from New Zealand, Ajax, who was Spanish, and Magawa, who was Tanzanian.

Recipients

See also
The Dickin Medal, a separate award also administered by the PDSA, which was established by Maria Dickin, founder of the PDSA, in 1943, to acknowledge acts of outstanding bravery by animals serving with military forces in theatres of war, and is considered the animal equivalent of the Victoria Cross.
 Swansea Jack  (1930–1937), twice decorated by the National Canine Defence League before the introduction of the PDSA Gold Medal

References

External links
People's Dispensary for Sick Animals website
The PDSA Animal Awards Programme

George Cross
Awards established in 2002
Awards to animals
2002 establishments in the United Kingdom